Chippawa may refer to:

 Chippawa, Ontario, Canada, a community
 Battle of Chippawa, a battle of the War of 1812
 Welland River, Ontario, originally named Chippawa Creek
 HMCS Chippawa, a Canadian Naval Reserve division in Winnipeg, Manitoba, Canada